Robert Moffett Allison Hawk (April 23, 1839 – June 29, 1882) was a U.S. Representative from Illinois.

Born near Rushville, Indiana, Hawk moved with his parents to Freedom Township, Carroll County, Illinois, in 1844.
He attended the common and select schools of Carroll County, Illinois, and Eureka College.
He studied law but never practiced.
He entered the Union Army during the Civil War as first lieutenant September 4, 1862.
He was promoted to captain on January 1, 1863.
Brevetted major April 10, 1865.
He moved to Mount Carroll, Illinois, in 1865 and engaged in agricultural pursuits.
He served as clerk of the court of Carroll County, Illinois, from December 13, 1865, to February 27, 1879.

Hawk was elected as a Republican to the Forty-sixth and Forty-seventh Congresses and served from March 4, 1879, until his death in Washington, D.C., June 29, 1882.
He was interred in Oak Hill Cemetery, Mount Carroll, Illinois.

See also
List of United States Congress members who died in office (1790–1899)

References

External links 

1839 births
1882 deaths
Eureka College alumni
People from Mount Carroll, Illinois
Union Army officers
Republican Party members of the United States House of Representatives from Illinois
19th-century American politicians
Military personnel from Illinois